The Gettysburgian is the monthly student magazine and digital publication for Gettysburg College in Gettysburg, Pennsylvania, United States. It was originally called the Weekly Gettysburgian and was first published in 1897. It provides local and campus news for the student population.

History 
During the summer of 2019, the editorial staff of The Gettysburgian decided to switch from a weekly newspaper to a monthly magazine to encourage more students to read it.

All articles are still published on The Gettysburgian website and is updated daily.

Notable writers 
 Bill Fleischman, sports journalist and professor

References

External links 
 Gettysburgian newspaper
 Gettysburgian newspaper archives - Gettysburg College (1897-2010)
 Illinois Digital Newspaper Collections: The Weekly Gettysburgian (1897-2004)

Student newspapers published in Pennsylvania
Gettysburg College
Education in Pennsylvania
Publications established in 1897